Georgios Simos or Charalampous (1919 – 12 February 1994), commonly known as "Magiras" (Which ment "Cooker", a nickname that followed him throughout his career, on the occasion of the fact that his grandfather maintained a cooking restaurant in Naxos), was a Greek professional footballer who played as a midfielder for AEK Athens and a manager.

Club career

Mageiras started football in 1931 from Eleftheroupoli and in 1933 he joined AEK Athens, at the age of 14 and in the first years, was a member of their academies, with teammates such as Kleanthis Maropoulos and Tryfon Tzanetis, with whom he later coexisted in the first team. He was part of the club that won the Panhellenic Championship and Greek Cup in 1939. Mageiras retired from football in 1949 after a serious injury in the Cup final against Panathinaikos on 19 June. With the "yellow-blacks" he won 2 Panhellenic Championships and 2 Greek Cups.

International career
He played a total of 4 times with Greece from 1948 to 1949. His debut came on 23 April 1948, in a friendly at home against Turkey, the first to be played after World War II, under the instructions of Kostas Negrepontis.

Managerial career
After his retirement from as a footballer, Magiras became involved in coaching. He coached Olympiacos Chalkida in the first division in 1960. He also worked at Egaleo in 1961. In the 1960's he was a partner of Lakis Petropoulos in the technical leadership of Greece. In 1972, he was also the coach of Pierikos. Magiras returned to Chalcis to coach Chalkida, in 1972 for a year and led them to 4th place in the standings.

Honours

AEK Athens
Panhellenic Championship: 1938–39, 1939–40
Greek Cup: 1938–39, 1948–49

See also
List of one-club men in association football

References

External links

List of men's players at Hellenic Football Federation

1919 births
Greek footballers
Greece international footballers
AEK Athens F.C. players
Egaleo F.C. managers
Proodeftiki F.C. managers
Vyzas F.C. managers
Apollon Smyrnis F.C. managers
Pierikos F.C. managers
1994 deaths
Association football midfielders
Eleftheroupoli F.C. players
Turkish emigrants to Greece
People from Urla, Izmir